RCA Thesaurus, a brand owned by RCA Victor, was a supplier of electrical transcriptions. Efforts were made as early as 1936 to consolidate The RCA Victor Transcription service with NBC's independent transcription service within the NBC radio network. NBC'sThesaurus catalog system and library of recordings was not completely merged with RCA's catalog until 1939 when the consolidation was completed in an effort to compete with rival transcription services which were available at the Mutual, Columbia and World Broadcasting Systems.   

During the 1950s, RCA Thesaurus produced under the musical direction of Ben Selvin in New York City.

In 1953 RCA Thesaurus bought a library of 1600 transcriptions. 

In 1954, John Serry Sr. recorded several of his arrangements for RCA Thesaurus with his ensemble The Bel-Cordions and the Serry Sextette. The group consisted of four accordions, string bass and guitar.  Copies of Serry's album and his original orchestral scores were donated to the Eastman School of Music's Sibley Music Library for archival purposes within the Ruth T. Watanabe Special Collections Department.

Classical compositions

 "Allegro" – Joseph Haydn  Arr. John Serry Sr. (Accordion Quartette 1954)
 "The Golden Wedding( La Cinquantaine)" – Jean Gabriel-Marie Arr. John Serry Sr. (Accordion Quartette 1954)
 "Tango of Love" – John Serry Sr.  Arr. John Serry Sr. (Accordion Quartette 1954)

Popular compositions 

 "Shine On, Harvest Moon" – Jack Noworth & Nora Bayes- Arr. John Serry Sr. (Sextette 1954)
 "My Melancholy Baby" – Ernie Burnett & George A. Norton – Arr. John Serry Sr. (Sextette 1954)
 "Singin' in the Rain" – Arthur Freed & Nacio Herb Brown – Arr. John Serry Sr. (Sextette 1954)
 "Nobody's Sweetheart" – Elmer Schoebel/Gus Kahn – Arr. John Serry Sr. (Sextette 1954)
 "Chicago" – Fred Fisher – Arr. John Serry Sr. (Sextette 1954)
 "If You Knew Susie" – Buddy DeSylva & Joseph Meyer -Arr. John Serry Sr. (Sextette 1954)
 "Somebody Stole My Gal" – Leo Wood – Arr. John Serry Sr. (Sextette 1954)
 "Ta-ra-ra Boom-de-ay" – Paul Stanley (composer) – Arr. John Serry Sr. (Sextette 1954)
 "Old McDonald" – Arr. John Serry Sr. (Sextette 1954)
 "Beer Barrel Polka" –  Jaromir Vejvoda/Eduard Ingris Arr. John Serry Sr. (Sextette 1954)
 "I Love Louisa" - Arthur Schwartz/Howard Dietz – Arr. John Serry Sr. (Sextette 1954)
 "Oh You Beautiful Doll" – Seymour Brown/ Nat D. Ayer – Arr. John Serry Sr. (Sextette 1954)
 "Chinatown, My Chinatown" -William Jerome/Jean Schwartz – Arr. John Serry Sr. (Sextette 1954)

Artistic ensembles

The Bel-Cordions

 John Serry, Sr. – First Accordionist/ Conductor/Arranger
 Louis Del Monte – Accordionist
 Alf Nystrom – Accordionist
 Ralph Vetro – Accordionist

Serry Sextette
 John Serry Sr. - First Acccordionist/ Conductor/Arranger
 Alf Nystrom - Accordionist
 Benny Mortell - Guitar
 Sammy Linner - Piano
 Doc Goldberg - Bass
 Harry Breur - Vibes/Marimba

References

Mass media companies established in 1935
Radio organizations in the United States
Electrical transcription companies